Results from Norwegian football in 1948.

Norgesserien 1947–48

Because of World War II, local qualifying leagues were organized in the 1946–47 season in order to determine the teams participating in Norgesserien 1947–48. No national league Championship was held in 1947 though.

District I

District II, Group A

District II, Group B

District III

District IV, Group A

District IV, Group B

District V, Group A

District V, Group B

District VI

District VII

District VIII

Championship Preliminary Rounds

First round
May 25: Vålerenga-Mjøndalen 0–2
Storm-Ørn 2–1
Viking-Donn 2–1

Second round
May 29: Mjøndalen-Vålerenga 2–2 (agg. 4–2)
Donn-Viking 2–4 (agg. 3–6)
May 31: Ørn-Storm 0–2 (agg. 1–4)

Championship quarter-finals
June 6: Mjøndalen-Storm 0–0
Kapp-Sparta 2–3
Viking-Brann 2–0
Freidig-Kristiansund 4–1

June 20: Storm-Mjøndalen 0–1 (agg. 0–1)
Sparta-Kapp 4–2 (agg. 7–4)
Brann-Viking 0–3 (agg. 0–5)
Kristiansund-Freidig 4–1 (agg. 5–5)

Rematch
June 23: Freidig-Kristiansund (Freidig got a walkover)

Championship semi-finals
June 27: Sparta-Mjøndalen 2–0
Viking-Freidig 2–2 (Extra time)

Rematch
July 6: Freidig-Viking 2–1

Championship final
July 9: Freidig-Sparta 2–1

Play off Preliminary Round
May 22: Birkebeineren-Sandaker 2–1
May 29: Sandaker-Birkebeineren 2–0 (agg. 3–2)

Birkebeineren relegated

Play-off, Group 1
June 6: Hardy-Lisleby 1–0
Ålgård-Donn 6–0
June 13: Lisleby-Donn 4–0
Ålgård-Hardy 3–0
July 4: Donn-Hardy 1–0
Lisleby-Ålgård 2–1

Play-off, Group 2
June 6: Sandaker-Ranheim 3–1

June 13: Kapp-Kristiansund 2–3

July 4: Ranheim-Kristiansund 3–0
Sandaker-Kapp 5–1
July 11: Kristiansund-Sandaker 0–1
Ranheim-Kapp 6–2

Norwegian Cup

Final

Northern Norwegian Cup

Final

National team

References

   
Seasons in Norwegian football